The 1986 Philippine Basketball Association (PBA) Open Conference was the third and final conference of the 1986 PBA season. It started on September 23 and ended on December 11, 1986. The tournament requires two import each per team with the height limit of 6"3 and 6"6.

Format
The following format will be observed for the duration of the conference:
 Double-round robin eliminations; 12 games per team; Teams are then seeded by basis on win–loss records.
 Team with the worst record after the elimination round will be eliminated. The top two teams will advance outright to the semifinals. 
 The next four teams will qualify to the single round robin quarterfinals. Results from the eliminations will be carried over. The top two teams will advance to the semifinals. 
 Semifinals will be a double round robin affair with the remaining teams. 
 The top two teams in the semifinals advance to the best-of-seven finals. The last two teams dispute the third-place trophy in a best-of-seven series.

List of Imports
Each team were allowed two imports. The first line in the table are the original reinforcements of the teams. Below the name are the replacement of the import above. Same with the third replacement that is also highlighted with a different color. GP is the number of games played.

Elimination round

Quarterfinals

Semifinals

Results

Third place playoffs

Finals

References

PBA Open Conference
Open Conference